Shuchi Kothari is a New Zealand-based Indian scriptwriter and producer. She is the co-writer of the film Firaaq. Born in Ahmedabad, Kothari studied writing at the University of Texas before moving to New Zealand in 1997.

Filmography

Writer
Firaaq
A Thousand Apologies
Coffee and Allah
Apron Strings

Producer
A Thousand Apologies
Coffee and Allah
Eeling

Actress
A Thousand Apologies

Awards 

 2010 Filmfare Awards (India) 
Critics’ Award for Best Film: Firaaq 
Nominated for Best Dialogue (with Nandita Das): for Firaaq

 2009 Qantas Film and Television Awards
Nominated for Best Screenplay - Film (with Dianne Taylor): for Apron Strings

 2008 Hawaii International Film Festival 
Best Short Film: Coffee and Allah

 2008 ‘Golden Minbar’ International Festival of Muslim Cinema (Russia)

Best Short Film: Coffee and Allah

External links

References

New Zealand film producers
New Zealand screenwriters
New Zealand women screenwriters
Living people
Place of birth missing (living people)
Year of birth missing (living people)
New Zealand women film producers